A Great Fall is a non-fiction book written by Mildred Savage. It was originally published in hardback by Simon & Schuster in 1970.

The book quotes from Giles v. State of Maryland, 386 U.S. 66, "A criminal trial is not a game in which the State’s function is to outwit and entrap its quarry. The State’s pursuit is justice, not a victim."

References

1970 non-fiction books
American non-fiction books